Razobazam (INN) is a drug which is a benzodiazepine derivative. Its mechanism of action appears to be quite different from that of most benzodiazepine drugs, and it produces nootropic effects in animal studies.

See also
Benzodiazepine
Zomebazam

References

Lactams
Pyrazolodiazepines